Imran Hussain can refer to:

 Imran Hussain (footballer), Pakistani footballer
 Imran Hussain (British politician), British Labour politician
 Imran Hussain (Indian politician), Indian politician